Sea of Madness may refer to:

 "Sea of Madness", a song by Crosby, Stills, Nash and Young from Woodstock: Music from the Original Soundtrack and More
 "Sea of Madness", a song by Iron Maiden from Somewhere in Time